The United States Ambassador to India is the chief diplomatic representative of United States in India. The U.S. Ambassador's office is situated at the U.S. Embassy in New Delhi.

On March 15, 2023, Eric Garcetti was confirmed as Ambassador.

Ambassador Kenneth Juster, who served from 2017 to 2021 under President Donald Trump, was the last non-interim appointee.

Chiefs of Mission to India

U.S. Ambassadors to the Dominion of India (1947–1950)
President George Washington, on November 19, 1792, nominated Benjamin Joy of Newbury Port as the first American Consul to Calcutta (now Kolkata) and later commissioned Joy to that office on November 21, 1792.

U.S. Ambassadors to the Republic of India (1950–present)

See also
Embassy of India, Washington, D.C.
India–United States relations
List of ambassadors of India to the United States
Foreign relations of India
Ambassadors of the United States

References

United States Department of State: Background notes on India

Sources
Brands, H. W. Inside the Cold War: Loy Henderson and the Rise of the American Empire 1918-1961 (1991) pp 196–230; Loy Henderson was US Ambassador, 1948–51

Primary sources
, US ambassador 1951-53 and 1963–69
 Galbraith, John K. Ambassador's journal: a personal account of the Kennedy years (1969) online, he was US ambassador to India 1961-63
U.S. Department of State.  Foreign Relations of the United States (FRUS), many volumes of primary sources; the complete texts of these large books are all online. See Guide to FRUS. For example, Foreign Relations of the United States, 1969–1976, Volume XI, South Asia Crisis, 1971 was published in 2005 and is online here. The most recent volumes are Foreign Relations of the United States, 1969–1976, Volume                    E–7, Documents on South Asia, 1969–1972 (2005) online here and Foreign Relations of the United States, 1969–1976, Volume E–8, Documents on South Asia, 1973–1976 (2007) online here. Included are the most important cables sent by the ambassador to Washington.

External links

 
India
United States